Lewis Ben Williams (born May 28, 1970) is a former American football player. He was born in Belzoni, Mississippi and was a defensive lineman at the University of Minnesota.  He left the school in 1992 as its career sack leader.  Williams started his professional career in the Canadian Football League with the Shreveport Pirates.  Then moved into the European Football League/World Football League and played with the London Monarchs, returned to the US  in 1998 and played one season with the Minnesota Vikings, playing in one game and in 1999 played with the Philadelphia Eagles, playing in 3 games. After retiring from football, Williams created a line of nutraceutical products. The two products he created were called Lifepro and Isotherm, both of which were sold under the Contour company name.

References

1970 births
Living people
American football defensive tackles
Minnesota Golden Gophers football players
London Monarchs players
Minnesota Vikings players
Philadelphia Eagles players
Shreveport Pirates players
People from Belzoni, Mississippi
Players of American football from Mississippi